Clinical and Translational Science is a bimonthly peer-reviewed open-access medical journal covering translational medicine. It is published by Wiley-Blackwell and is an official journal of the American Society for Clinical Pharmacology and Therapeutics. The journal was established in 2008 and the editor-in-chief is John A. Wagner (Cygnal Therapeutics).

Abstracting and indexing 
The journal is abstracted and indexed in:

According to the Journal Citation Reports, its 2020 impact factor is 4.689.

References

External links

American Society for Clinical Pharmacology and Therapeutics

General medical journals
Wiley-Blackwell academic journals
Publications established in 2008
Bimonthly journals
English-language journals
Translational medicine
Creative Commons Attribution-licensed journals